Milton Keynes Dons Women (usually abbreviated to MK Dons Women) are a women's association football club in Milton Keynes, Buckinghamshire, England. Founded in 2009, the club is affiliated with Milton Keynes Dons. They are currently members of the third tier .

Previously known as Milton Keynes Dons Ladies, the club's current name took effect ahead of the 2019–20 season.

Stadium

Until 2018, the club played their home games at Willen Road Sports Ground in Newport Pagnell, which is also the home of men's amateur association football club Newport Pagnell Town.

As of the 2018–19 season, the team share Stadium MK as their home stadium with their male counterparts, Milton Keynes Dons - one of the first clubs in the country to share a stadium between both men's and women's teams of the same club.

Players

First team squad

Honours

League
FA WPL South East Division One
 Winners: 2017–18

Cup
Berks & Bucks Senior Women's Cup
Winners: 2013–14, 2014–15, 2015–16, 2017–18 2018–19
Runners-up: 2016–17

References

External links

MK Dons SET
Official Supporters Association website

Sport in Milton Keynes
Football clubs in Buckinghamshire
2009 establishments in England
Association football clubs established in 2009
Women's football clubs in England